"Pride." (stylized as "PRIDE.") is a song by American rapper Kendrick Lamar, taken from his fourth studio album Damn, released on April 14, 2017. The seventh track on the album (eighth on the Collector's Edition of Damn), the song was written by Lamar, Steve Lacy, Anna Wise, and Anthony Tiffith, and produced by Lacy and Tiffith, with additional production by Bēkon. "Pride" charted in multiple countries in 2017.

The song features background vocals from producer Steve Lacy and singer Anna Wise, the latter having previously collaborated with Lamar on "These Walls", which won her a Grammy Award for Best Rap/Sung Collaboration.

Writing 
The song features songwriting collaborations from American singer Anna Wise who, prior to her work on "Pride", won the Grammy Award for Best Rap/Sung Collaboration in 2016 with Lamar for his song "These Walls", from his third studio album To Pimp a Butterfly.

Production 
According to producer Steve Lacy, he created the beat for "Pride" on his iPhone 6. Lacy also said that before the song's release, it was originally titled "Wasn't There" before being renamed to "Pride".

The song has a tempo of 139 BPM and is in the key of E minor.

Critical reception 
In a mixed review, Maeve McDermott of USA Today said the song was not that memorable, but its enjoyable mix of influences make it worth listening to.

Lost verse 
Shortly after the release of Damn, a lost handwritten verse from "Pride" was released by the co-president of Top Dawg Entertainment, Punch, on his Instagram page. The lost verse reads as follows:
Pride is my biggest sin
I tried to fight it but I never win
Lay’n myself down in the beds I made
Karma is always knockin with capital K’s
It started when I was toss’n my life in the sand
Cross’n the street, momma don’t you hold my hand
Time revealing itself
My ways are magnified
Same patterns requiring that I never camouflaged
Looking at me in shock you found my identity
Asking yourself do I have room 4 empathy
Everything is subject 2 change
But not me

Live performances 
Lamar performed "Pride" live at the Coachella Valley Music and Arts Festival on April 23, 2017.

Credits and personnel 
Credits adapted from the official Damn digital booklet.
Kendrick Lamar – songwriter
Steve Lacy – songwriter, producer, background vocals
Anna Wise – songwriter, background vocals
Anthony Tiffith – songwriter, producer
Bēkon – additional production, additional vocals
Derek Ali – mixing
Tyler Page – mixing, mix assistant
Cyrus Taghipour – mix assistant

Charts

Certifications

References 

2017 songs
Kendrick Lamar songs
Songs written by Kendrick Lamar
Songs written by Steve Lacy (guitarist)
Songs written by Anna Wise